Shane Patrick Redmond  (born 23 March 1989) is an Irish footballer who played as a goalkeeper. He now plays Gaelic football with St Mary's, Saggart in the Dublin Senior Football Championship.

Career
Born in Dublin, Redmond began his career with Rathcoole Boys before moving to famed Dublin schoolboy club Cherry Orchard.

Nottingham Forest
Redmond signed for Nottingham Forest from Cherry Orchard in July 2006. In November 2008 he joined Eastwood Town on loan. He spent five months on loan with the eventual Northern Premier League Premier Division winners, making a total of 31 appearances: 24 in the league and seven in Eastwood's successful FA Cup run. Redmond was recalled by Forest on 6 April 2009 as cover for Paul Smith.

Burton Albion
On 6 July 2009, Forest agreed to loan the Republic of Ireland under-21 keeper to Burton Albion until January, with the possibility of a season-long agreement. After his first game for Burton Albion, in which they suffered a 3–1 defeat against Shrewsbury Town, he was replaced by his fellow on-loan goalkeeper Artur Krysiak.

Darlington
Redmond returned to Forest in January 2010, but was soon loaned out again to League Two strugglers Darlington. He made his full league debut against Northampton Town which ended in a 2–1 defeat for his new club.

Chesterfield
Redmond was among a number of players released by Forest at the end of the 2009–10 season. On 4 August 2010, he signed for League Two side Chesterfield on a monthly contract after a successful pre-season trial with the club. Despite not playing in a single match for the Spireites, Redmond was reserve goalkeeper on a regular basis he was able to gain a Football League Two winners medal. Redmond was released by Chesterfield at the end of the 2010–11 season as his contract had expired.

Mansfield Town
On 1 July 2011, Redmond was announced as Mansfield Town's latest signing. He was released by Mansfield at the end of the 2012–13 season.

Bray Wanderers
In July 2013, Redmond signed for League of Ireland Premier Division club Bray Wanderers.
He was largely understudy to first choice goalkeeper Darren Quigley in the Carlisle Grounds.

International
Redmond has been capped 21 times by the Republic of Ireland U21's, a record level of appearances.

Gaelic football
After finishing playing professional football, Redmond returned to Gaelic football with St. Mary's, Saggart in the Dublin Senior Football Championship.

References

External links

1989 births
Living people
Association footballers from Dublin (city)
Republic of Ireland association footballers
Republic of Ireland under-21 international footballers
Association football goalkeepers
Nottingham Forest F.C. players
Eastwood Town F.C. players
Burton Albion F.C. players
Darlington F.C. players
Chesterfield F.C. players
Mansfield Town F.C. players
English Football League players
National League (English football) players
Cherry Orchard F.C. players
Gaelic footballers who switched code
St Mary's (Dublin) Gaelic footballers
Bray Wanderers F.C. players